Philip Bračanin (born 26 May 1942) is an Australian composer and musicologist.

Life
Bračanin was born in Kalgoorlie, the son of Croatian immigrants. HIs early musical studies were with Miss Olive Ruane, and he graduated from the University of Western Australia in 1962 with bachelor's degrees in mathematics and music. He pursued graduate studies at the same school in musicology specialising in analysis of 20th-century music, earning an MA in 1968 and a PhD in 1970. His master's thesis was on the music of Mátyás Seiber and his doctorate thesis was on the music of Anton Webern.  From 1970 to 2008  he served on the staff of the University of Queensland.   For 9 years he was Dean of the Faculty of Music and 10 years Head of the School of Music and is now Emeritus Professor.  Professor Bracanin served on the boards of the Australian Music Centre, Queensland Philharmonic Orchestra, Queensland Symphony Orchestra and 4MBS Classic Radio.   

Bračanin initially began composing music in the 1970s for the purposes of creating music that would more effectively teach his students certain aspects of harmony and counterpoint. He eventually became interested in creating more serious compositions for their own sake, with his 1977 Trombone Concerto being now regarded as his first mature work. He has since produced a considerable body of music, including symphonic works, choral works, chamber music, and pieces for solo piano. Many works by Bračanin are published by the Australian Music Centre and Maecenas Music.  He has occasionally been musically inspired by the Dalmatian Croatian musical heritage of his forebears. In 1988 Bračanin was composer in residence at the Anglo-Australian Music Festival in Birmingham, England. In 1991, he fulfilled a similar role at the Bournemouth International Festival, at which two of his works were performed, including a festival commission. In 1995 his Guitar Concerto won the APRA Award for the best Australian Classical Composition.

Selected works

Orchestral
 With and Without (1975)
 Heterophony (1979)
 Rondellus Suite for string orchestra (1980)
 Sinfonia Mescolanza (1982)
 Concerto for Orchestra (1985)
 Concerto for Orchestra No. 2 (1987)
 Muzika za viganj (1989)
 Dance Poem for chamber orchestra (1990)
 Elysian Voyage for string orchestra (1992)
 Dance Tableaus (1993)
 Symphony No. 1 (1994)
 Symphony No. 2 for soprano, mixed chorus and orchestra (1994); words by Judith Wright and W. H. Auden
 Symphony No. 3 (1995)
 Windmills of Time for string orchestra (2000)
 Clocktower (2002)
 University of Queensland Processional (2003)
 Symphony No. 4 (2006)
 St. Lucia Suite for string orchestra (2007)

Wind ensemble
 Spiral Resonance for symphonic wind band (1999)

Concertante
 Concerto for trombone and orchestra (1977)
 Concerto for piano and orchestra (1980)
 Concertino for piano and string orchestra (1983)
 Concerto for violin and orchestra (1983)
 Concerto for clarinet and orchestra (1985)
 Concerto for cello and orchestra (1989)
 Concerto for oboe and string orchestra (1989)
 Concerto for viola and orchestra (1990)
 Concerto for guitar and chamber orchestra (1991; premiered 1992 by Karin Schaupp)
 Dance Gundah for orchestra with solo didjeridu (1998)
 Concertino for trombone and orchestra (1999)
 Blackwood River Concerto, Double Concerto for guitar, marimba (or vibraphone) and orchestra (2002)
 Shades of Autumn, Concerto for oboe and chamber orchestra (2003)
 Shadows of Time, Double Concerto for oboe, guitar and chamber orchestra (2005)

Chamber music
 String Quartet (1971)
 Suite for trombone and piano (1976)
 Three Pieces for violin and piano (1976)
 Forpasis for wind sextet (1977)
 Tre affetti musicali, Duo for flute and guitar (1989)
 Of Thoughts Unspoken, Quartet for clarinet, viola, cello and piano (1996)
 Thoughts Feelings Actions for guitar solo (1997)
 Midsummer Nights' Music, Suite for 3 guitars (1999)
 Under Yaraandoo for guitar, didjeridu and percussion (4 performers) (1999)
 String Quartet No. 3 (2000)
 Blackwood River Suite for guitar and string quartet (2001)
 KL Sojourn for string quartet (2004)
 Four Bagatelles or guitar solo
 Four Diversions for guitar
 Mesco Lanza for cello and piano

Piano
 Al ma'luma (1976)
 Three Pieces

Vocal
 Selections from the Rubaiyat of Omar Khayyam for mixed chorus and string orchestra (1976)
 From the Roundabout Singing Garden for mixed chorus and string orchestra (1976); text by C.J. Dennis
 Because We Have No Time, Song Cycle for baritone and orchestra (1981); poems from Dylan Thomas and W. H. Auden
The Force That through the Green Fuse Drives the Flower
And Death Shall Have No Dominion
One Circumlocution
No Time
Our Bias
Another Time
 A Woman's Question, Song Cycle for soprano and pianoforte (1982)
 A Quiet Quick Catch of the Breath, Song Cycle for 2 sopranos, alto, tenor, 2 basses (1986); poetry by Michael Thwaites
 Throw Me a Heaven around a Child, Song Cycle for baritone and orchestra (1986)
 No Further Need, 2 Two-part Songs for female voices; poetry by Michael Thwaites
 Eternal Image for soprano, clarinet, horn and piano (1998)

References

Further reading
Gillies, Malcolm. 1995. "The Flight of the Muse: Philip Bračanin as Composer". In Essays in Honour of David Evatt Tunley, edited by Frank Callaway, 165–75. Nedlands: Callaway International Resource Centre for Music Education. .
Gillies, Malcolm. 2001. "Bračanin, Philip". The New Grove Dictionary of Music and Musicians, second edition, edited by Stanley Sadie and John Tyrrell. London: Macmillan Publishers.

1942 births
Living people
Australian male composers
Australian composers
Academic staff of the University of Queensland
University of Western Australia alumni
People from Kalgoorlie
Australian people of Croatian descent
Musicians from Western Australia